Arshad Said Saleh Said Al-Alawi (born on 12 April 2000) is an Omani professional footballer who plays for Al-Shabab and the Omani national team.

He debuted internationally on 10 October 2019, during the 2022 FIFA World Cup qualification, in a match against Afghanistan in a 3–0 victory.

On 14 November 2019, Al-Alawi scored his first goal in a major competition for Oman against Bangladesh in a 4–1 victory.

Arshad played in all three games of the group stage for Oman in the Arab Cup, and scored the opener against Bahrain in 3–0 victory to qualify for knockout stages.

Career statistics

International
Statistics accurate as of match played on 06 December 2021

International goals

References

External links
 

2000 births
Living people
Omani footballers
Oman international footballers
Association football forwards
Al-Shabab SC (Seeb) players
Oman Professional League players
People from Nizwa